Florin Călinescu (born 29 April 1956, Timișoara, Timiș County, Socialist Republic of Romania) is a Romanian politician, former leader of the Green Party of Romania (PV), actor, theatre director, and television host. From 1996 to 2000, he hosted the popular late-night TV talk show The Issue of the Day. He also starred in Filantropica and is known for his role in the all-time blockbuster Neighbourhood Story (Poveste de cartier), as Davinci Stănescu.

Selected filmography 

 O vară de neuitat Un été inoubliable (1994)
 Asphalt Tango, French-Romanian film (1996)
 Anticamera, TV series (2008)
 "Poveste de cartier", film (2008)
 Tanti Florica, TV series (2012–present)

Electoral history

Mayor of Bucharest

References 

1956 births
Actors from Timișoara
Romanian male film actors
Romanian male television actors
Romanian male stage actors
Romanian television presenters
Romanian theatre directors
Living people